The Ruiner is the third and final studio album by American noise-rock/post-metal band Made Out of Babies. It was released through The End Records on June 24, 2008.

Track listing

References

2008 albums
Made Out of Babies albums
The End Records albums